Macrocydia is a genus of moths of the family Tortricidae.

Species
Macrocydia divergens Brown & Baixeras, 2006

See also
List of Tortricidae genera

References

External links
tortricidae.com

Tortricidae genera
Olethreutinae